The World Port Tournament is an international baseball tournament held at the Neptunus Familiestadion in Rotterdam, Netherlands.  The tournament has been held every other year ( excluded) in odd-numbered years since , alternating with the Haarlem Baseball Week.

The tournament was created by Bram Peper, who was asked by Cuban Dr. Oscar Ferdinand Mell to organize an international baseball tournament, between national baseball teams all over the world, in Rotterdam, Netherlands. The 2017 World Port Tournament, the sixteenth edition of the event, was won by Chinese Taipei, winning the tournament the second time in history.

Results

Medal table

  Chinese Taipei is the official WBSC designation for the team representing the state officially referred to as the Republic of China, more commonly known as Taiwan. (See also political status of Taiwan for details.)

See also
Baseball in the Netherlands

External links
World Port Tournament official website (Dutch)

 
International baseball competitions hosted by the Netherlands
Recurring sporting events established in 1985